In Greek mythology, Glaucus was a Greek prophetic sea-god.

Glaucus, often transliterated to Glafkos, may also refer to:

People
 Glaucus, son of Aepytus of Messenia
 Glaucus (son of Sisyphus), of Potniae
 Glaucus (son of Minos), of Crete
 Glaucus (son of Hippolochus), of Lycia, grandson of the hero Bellerophon
 Glaucus of Carystus, an ancient Greek athlete
 Glaucus of Chios (c. 7th century BCE), Greek sculptor in metal
 Apollonius Glaucus, 2nd-century Roman physician
 Glafcos Clerides (1919–2013), former President of Cyprus

Rivers
 Glafkos (river), a river in Patras, Greece
 Glaucus (river of Asia Minor), rivers in Asia Minor

Ships
 Greek submarine Glafkos (Υ-6), a Protefs-class submarine of the Hellenic Navy
 SS Glaucus (1871), shipwrecked in 1921
 USS Glaucus (1863), a steamship of the Union Navy during the American Civil War

Other
 1870 Glaukos, a Trojan asteroid
 Glaucus (gastropod), a genus of nudibranchs in the family Glaucidae
 Glaucus (mythology), characters named Glaucus in Greek mythology
 Glaucus (sculpture), a sculpture by the French artist Auguste Rodin
 The protagonist in the 1834 novel The Last Days of Pompeii by Edward Bulwer-Lytton
 , a linea on Europa
 Glaucus Sinus, now Gulf of Fethiye in Turkey
 Project Glaucus, an underwater habitat in Plymouth Sound

See also

 Glaucias (disambiguation)
 Glaucous
 Glauce
 Glaucia